Alexander Nikolayevich Abalakov (born 29 November 1959) is a Russian politician and member of the State Duma of the Russian Federation for the Communist Party of the Russian Federation.

Early life and education
Alexander Abalakov was born on 29 November 1959 in the village of Zalesovo, Altai Krai, Russian SFSR, Soviet Union. In 1977, he enrolled Novosibirsk Electrotechnical Institute, from which he graduated with honors in 1982 as a certified electrical engineer with a degree in Information and Measuring Technology.

Career
In 1979, he began his career as a laboratory assistant in the research sector. He worked at his occupation in nuclear and tool-making industry from 1982 to 1989. In 1989, he, with the help of his companions, established and took over a cooperative, which is the ancestor of today's F1 Business Group.

In December 2005, he was elected deputy of the Novosibirsk Regional Council of Deputies. Before 2010, he served on the Committee for Construction, Housing and Communal Services.

On 4 December 2011, he became deputy of the 6th State Duma of the Russian Federation, having been elected in the 2011 parliamentary election as part of the federal list of candidates nominated by the Communist Party of the Russian Federation for Novosibirsk Oblast. He is a member of the State Duma Committee on Housing Policy and Housing and Communal Services.

References

1959 births
Living people
People from Altai Krai
Communist Party of the Russian Federation members
Sixth convocation members of the State Duma (Russian Federation)
Russian electrical engineers